Malta selected their Junior Eurovision Song Contest 2004 entry through the national final "Junior Song For Europe 2004", being held on 24 September 2004. Young Talent Team represented Malta in Lillehammer, Norway. They finished 12th with 14 points.

Before Junior Eurovision

Junior Song For Europe 2004 
The Maltese entrant and song was selected through "Junior Song For Europe 2004". It took place on 24 September 2004. 16 acts competed and only one became the winner. Young Talent Team won the national final with just one point in front of the runner-up Dario Bezzina. The winner was selected by a professional jury and the Maltese televiewers.

At Eurovision
Malta performed 2nd in the contest, following Greece and preceding the Netherlands. Malta placed 12th out of total 18 countries with 14 points.

Voting

References

Malta
Junior Eurovision Song Contest
2004